Riderch II was, according to the Harleian genealogies, the son of Eugein II, the son of King Dumnagual III of Alt Clut. He is known only from this source, and there is no direct evidence he was king of Alt Clut (the region around Dumbarton Rock), although he is usually regarded as such by scholars. The Harleian genealogies indicate he was the father of Dumnugual IV, evidently his successor as king.

Notes

References
 MacQuarrie, Alan, "The Kings of Strathclyde", in A. Grant & K.Stringer (eds.) Medieval Scotland: Crown, Lordship and Community, Essays Presented to G.W.S. Barrow, (Edinburgh, 1993), pp. 1–19

External links
 Harleian genealogy 5

9th-century Scottish monarchs
Monarchs of Strathclyde
Year of death unknown
Year of birth unknown